Wendlandia is a genus of flowering plants in the family Rubiaceae. It is found in northeastern tropical Africa, and from tropical and subtropical Asia to Queensland.

Species

 Wendlandia aberrans F.C.How
 Wendlandia acuminata Cowan
 Wendlandia amocana Cowan
 Wendlandia andamanica Cowan
 Wendlandia angustifolia Wight ex Hook.f.
 Wendlandia appendiculata Wall. ex Hook.f.
 Wendlandia arabica Deflers
 Wendlandia arborescens Cowan
 Wendlandia augustini Cowan
 Wendlandia basistaminea F.Muell.
 Wendlandia bicuspidata Wight & Arn.
 Wendlandia bouvardioides Hutch.
 Wendlandia brachyantha Merr.
 Wendlandia brevipaniculata W.C.Chen
 Wendlandia brevituba Chun & F.C.How ex W.C.Chen
 Wendlandia buddleacea F.Muell.
 Wendlandia budleioides Wall. ex Wight & Arn.
 Wendlandia burkillii Cowan
 Wendlandia cambodiana Pit.
 Wendlandia cavaleriei H.Lév.
 Wendlandia connata C.T.White
 Wendlandia coriacea (Wall.) DC.
 Wendlandia dasythyrsa Miq.
 Wendlandia densiflora (Blume) DC.
 Wendlandia erythroxylon Cowan
 Wendlandia ferruginea Pierre ex Pit.
 Wendlandia formosana Cowan
 Wendlandia fulva Cowan
 Wendlandia gamblei Cowan
 Wendlandia glabrata DC.
 Wendlandia glomerulata Kurz
 Wendlandia guangdongensis W.C.Chen
 Wendlandia heyneana Wall. ex Wight & Arn.
 Wendlandia heynei (Schult.) Santapau & Merchant
 Wendlandia inclusa C.T.White
 Wendlandia jingdongensis W.C.Chen
 Wendlandia junghuhniana Miq.
 Wendlandia lauterbachii Valeton
 Wendlandia laxa S.K.Wu ex W.C.Chen
 Wendlandia ligustrina Wall. ex G.Don
 Wendlandia ligustroides (Boiss. & Hohen.) Blakelock
 Wendlandia litseifolia F.C.How
 Wendlandia longidens (Hance) Hutch.
 Wendlandia longipedicellata F.C.Chow
 Wendlandia luzoniensis DC.
 Wendlandia merrilliana Cowan
 Wendlandia myriantha F.C.Chow
 Wendlandia nervosa Merr.
 Wendlandia nitens Wall. ex G.Don
 Wendlandia nobilis Geddes
 Wendlandia oligantha W.C.Chen
 Wendlandia ovata Merr.
 Wendlandia paedicalyx Pit.
 Wendlandia paniculata (Roxb.) DC.
 Wendlandia parviflora W.C.Chen
 Wendlandia pendula (Wall.) DC.
 Wendlandia philippinensis Cowan
 Wendlandia pingpienensis F.C.Chow
 Wendlandia proxima (D.Don) DC.
 Wendlandia psychotrioides (F.Muell.) F.Muell.
 Wendlandia puberula DC.
 Wendlandia pubigera W.C.Chen
 Wendlandia salicifolia Franch.
 Wendlandia scabra Kurz
 Wendlandia sericea W.C.Chen
 Wendlandia sibuyanensis Cowan
 Wendlandia sikkimensis Cowan
 Wendlandia speciosa Cowan
 Wendlandia subalpina W.W.Sm.
 Wendlandia syringoides (Cowan) Cowan
 Wendlandia ternifolia Cowan
 Wendlandia teysmanniana Miq.
 Wendlandia thorelii Pit.
 Wendlandia thyrsoidea (Roth) Steud.
 Wendlandia tinctoria (Roxb.) DC.
 Wendlandia tombuyukonensis Suzana
 Wendlandia tonkiniana Pit.
 Wendlandia urceolata C.T.White
 Wendlandia uvariifolia Hance
 Wendlandia villosa W.C.Chen
 Wendlandia wallichii Wight & Arn.
 Wendlandia warburgii Merr.

References

External links
Wendlandia in the World Checklist of Rubiaceae

 
Rubiaceae genera
Taxonomy articles created by Polbot